The 1968 European Junior Games was the third edition of the biennial athletics competition for European athletes aged under twenty. It was the final edition of the competition under that name and was succeeded by the European Athletics Junior Championships in 1970. The event was held in Leipzig, East Germany, between 23 and 25 August. The competition was mainly between Eastern European countries, with Belgium, Austria, Netherlands and Greece being present from the west.

Men's results

Women's results

Medal table

Participation

References

Results
European Junior Championships 1968. World Junior Athletics History. Retrieved on 2013-05-29.

European Athletics U20 Championships
International athletics competitions hosted by Germany
European Junior
Sports competitions in Leipzig
International sports competitions hosted by East Germany
Multi-sport events in East Germany
1968 in youth sport
1968 in East German sport